The 1999–2000 Lithuanian Hockey League season was the ninth season of the Lithuanian Hockey League, the top level of ice hockey in Lithuania. Four teams participated in the league, and Vyltis Elektrenai won the championship. Vyltis was the first team to win the league other than SC Energija.

Standings

External links
Season on hockeyarchives.info

Lithuanian Hockey League
Lithuania Hockey League seasons
Lith